23S rRNA (adenine2085-N6)-dimethyltransferase (ErmC' methyltransferase, ermC methylase, ermC 23S rRNA methyltransferase, rRNA:m6A methyltransferase ErmC', ErmC', rRNA methyltransferase ErmC' ) is an enzyme with systematic name S-adenosyl-L-methionine:23S rRNA (adenine2085-N6)-dimethyltransferase. This enzyme catalyses the following chemical reaction

 2 S-adenosyl-L-methionine + adenine2085 in 23S rRNA  2 S-adenosyl-L-homocysteine + N6-dimethyladenine2085 in 23S rRNA

ErmC is a methyltransferase that confers resistance to the macrolide-lincosamide-streptogramin B group of antibiotics by catalysing the methylation of 23S rRNA at adenine2085.

References

External links 
 

EC 2.1.1